Lorimer Park is a  public park in Abington Township, Pennsylvania.  The park, a bequest from George Horace Lorimer (long-time editor-in-chief of The Saturday Evening Post), is connected to Pennypack Park in Philadelphia County, and the Pennypack Creek runs through both parks. The park borders Fox Chase Farm, one of only two remaining active farms in Philadelphia County.

External links
 Montgomery County Parks website

References

Parks in Montgomery County, Pennsylvania